Mistborn is a series of epic fantasy novels written by American author Brandon Sanderson and published by Tor Books. The first trilogy, published between 2006 and 2008, consists of The Final Empire, The Well of Ascension, and The Hero of Ages. A second series was released between 2011 and 2022, and consists of The Alloy of Law, Shadows of Self, The Bands of Mourning and The Lost Metal.
A third series will follow them, which is likely to be released yearly from 2025 to 2027. A fourth trilogy is also planned. Sanderson also released a novella in 2016, Mistborn: Secret History.

The first Mistborn trilogy chronicles the efforts of a secret group of Allomancers who attempt to overthrow a dystopian empire and establish themselves in a world covered by ash. The first trilogy was a huge success and it pushed Sanderson to further develop his fictional universe, the Cosmere, which also includes The Stormlight Archive. Set about 300 years after the ending of the first trilogy, the second series is about the exploits of Waxillium Ladrian, a "wild-west Deputy" forced to move into the big city, and starts investigating kidnappings and robberies. The third series will be set in the early computer age with 1980s technology. The main character is planned as a Terris woman who is a computer programmer and Nicroburst; her brother is also planned to be a character. The fourth series is planned to be a space-opera.

Development history 
Sanderson's first idea for Mistborn came while reading the Harry Potter series: He thought it would be interesting to set a story in a world where the "dark lord" triumphed and the "prophesied hero" failed. His second idea, originally unrelated, was to tell a heist story in a fantasy setting, an idea inspired by the Ocean's film series. The idea for the titular mist came while he was driving through mist in Idaho, which he combined with his memories of having once seen Washington National Cathedral lit from the inside. He originally developed feruchemy and allomancy for separate stories before deciding to bring them together in one story.

Sanderson began work on Mistborn: The Final Empire while trying to get his earlier novel Elantris published. After writing two early iterations of Mistborn, he shifted his focus to his Stormlight Archive series, but chose to delay its publication in favor of completing the Mistborn series, which he thought would serve as a better follow-up to Elantris.

Publication and future 
The original trilogy published by Sanderson was the first in what he used to call a "trilogy of trilogies." Sanderson planned to publish multiple trilogies all set on the fictional planet Scadrial but in different eras: the second trilogy was to be set in an urban setting, featuring modern technology, and the third trilogy was to be a science fiction series, set in the far future. However, this structure changed with the release of The Alloy of Law, which began a new series set between the first trilogy and the planned second trilogy. After some confusion, Sanderson decided to refer to the overall series in terms of four eras, with Era One being the first trilogy, Era Two being the four books starting with The Alloy of Law, and Eras Three and Four being the other planned trilogies.

Setting
The series primarily takes place in a region on the planet of Scadrial. The events of Era One primarily take place in Classical Scadrial, specifically within the Final Empire, while Era Two and beyond take place in Post-Catacendre Scadrial.

Prehistory 
Preservation and Ruin are the two opposing gods of the Mistborn world, Scadrial. They are described as Shards of Adonalsium; fragments of the power of creation. Preservation and Ruin agree to a pact, with an initial stalemate between them, each aware that only together could they create and achieve their separate goals while knowing they would never gain complete final satisfaction. Preservation could not keep things perfect and unchanging and Ruin could not destroy completely. Ruin is of destruction, without malice, but intent on reducing everything to the molecular level. Imprisoned by Preservation in an attempt to prevent Ruin from destroying the world, Ruin's consciousness was trapped by the Well of Ascension and kept mostly impotent. Ruin's remaining strength enables it with small powers to alter writing and Feruchemical Memories, but it cannot alter writing inscribed in metal or normal memories. It was Preservation that wanted to create life on Scadrial, but needed Ruin's help to do so. In exchange for Ruin's help, Preservation promised that Ruin would be allowed to destroy everything one day. However, after they had succeeded in creating the world, Preservation reneged on its bargain and sacrificed a significant portion of its power to create the Well of Ascension as a prison for Ruin, thus preventing the destruction of the world.

Classical Scadrial (Era One) 
On Classical Scadrial, the sun and sky are red, vegetation is brown, and the ground is constantly being covered under black volcanic ash falls. Every night the land becomes covered in an unnatural fog, known as the "mists". One thousand years before the story begins, the ruler of the Final Empire, the Lord Ruler, gained access to a divine power at the "Well of Ascension", where he is rumored to have defeated the unknown danger called the "Deepness". With this power, he remade the world and everything in it into its state at the beginning of the first three books. After this event, he established "The Final Empire", which he would rule over for the next thousand years.

The Dominances 
Within the Final Empire, a Dominance is a territory within the Lord Ruler's empire. The dominances are:

 Central Dominance (Seat of the Final Empire)
 Northern Dominance
 Western Dominance
 Eastern Dominance
 Southern Dominance
 Crescent Dominance
 Farmost Dominance
 Southern Islands 
 Remote Dominance
 Terris Dominance

Major cities within the Final Empire are: 
 Luthadel is the capital of the Central Dominance and the entire Final Empire, serving as the heart of the Lord Ruler's power, as well as the site of his palace, Kredik Shaw.  Before the Lord Ruler remade the world, Luthadel was in a mountainous region known as Terris. To hide the true location of Old Terris and the Well of Ascension, the Lord Ruler moved the mountains elsewhere and named that region "Terris" instead. Terris is the ancestral home of the Terris people. It is a mountainous region located north of the Northern Dominance.
 Urteau is a key crossroads city in the Northern Dominance. It was the traditional seat of House Venture, although the family is based mainly in Luthadel. It later came under the control of a Skaa-dominated government led by a man calling himself 'the Citizen'. Urteau is also famous for its canals, which mysteriously ran dry at some point in the past. It plays a key role in the third novel.
 Fadrex City is an important crossroads city in the Western Dominance. Although all cities outside of Luthadel are forbidden from having walls, Fadrex City has a natural rock formation that makes it very defensible. Yomen, an Obligator, claimed the city after the fall of the Lord Ruler for this very reason.

The Steel Ministry 
The Steel Ministry is the church and central government of the Final Empire, created by the Lord Ruler to manage his empire and church. While the Lord Ruler allowed the Noblemen to control most aspects of the empire, such as the production of resources, he used the Steel Ministry to control the Nobles. The Steel Ministry has two groups of people who are used to control different aspects of society; Steel Inquisitors and Obligators. All Obligators were formerly nobles, usually Allomancers and are trained in the arts of bureaucracy and the teachings of the Steel Ministry. They are marked by tattoos which decorate their face and body; the more tattooed an Obligator is, the higher their rank. They serve as witnesses for every possible legal contract (e.g., business deals and marriages), which means that they are privy to all happenings among the nobles.  This gave the Lord Ruler great control over the nobility, as any contract not witnessed by one of his Obligators, did not officially take place.

The Steel Ministry is organized into four subsections, called "Cantons".

 Canton of Finance: Directs the financial operations of the Final Empire
 Canton of Resource: Manages trade, transport, and taxation within the Final Empire
 Canton of Inquisition: Manages law enforcement within the Final Empire; run by the Steel Inquisitors
 Canton of Orthodoxy: Organizes and presides over the Steel Ministry, especially its religious aspect

The Nobility and Skaa 
The nobility are the descendants of the early supporters of the Lord Ruler. The Lord Ruler gave them the gift of Allomancy in the early years of his reign because of their support of him. The Allomantic power has been passed down through the generations, but their Allomantic gifts have grown weaker over the years. "Mistings" have only one of the many Allomantic powers, while "Mistborns" have all the powers.  At first there were few Mistings, but now Mistings far outnumber Mistborn. Allomancy is the main reason the interbreeding of nobles and skaa was made illegal by the Lord Ruler. The Lord Ruler had more control over the Nobles, so he didn't want the skaa to have Allomancy.

During the reign of the Lord Ruler, the skaa were oppressed slaves treated brutally. While noblemen oversaw skaa workers, all skaa belong to the Lord Ruler and were  loaned to the nobility for work. There were multiple skaa rebellions over the centuries, but none ever came close to succeeding. All skaa Allomancers have some noble blood.

Before the Ascension of the Lord Ruler, weapons technology had progressed to the invention of gunpowder. At the beginning of his reign, the Lord Ruler deliberately suppressed knowledge of gunpowder and most other advances. This was done to prevent technology undermining his military strength and being used against him in rebellions. This left archers as the only long-range military option, and it left skaa rebellions at a disadvantage as archers require considerable training. The only major advance since the Lord Ruler's reign started is the invention of canned food.

Hemalurgic Constructs 
When the Lord Ruler ascended at the Well of Ascension, he created 3 unique species. Each of these are created using Hemalurgy, though the number of required spikes differs for each.

Kandra are highly intelligent life forms without distinct shape, physically resembling blobs of muscle in their natural form. They are however, capable shapeshifters. The prime function of the kandra are as spies, because of their notable ability to imitate any being. They can consume the corpses or bones 
of dead creatures, memorizing and replicating the physical traits perfectly. The First Generation of kandra were converted by the Lord Ruler from pre-Ascension Terris Worldbringers, the sect of spiritual leaders and Feruchemists. All kandra created after the First Generation are made from Mistwraiths, with a select amount being created every hundred years. Mistwraiths, named the Unbirthed by Kandra, are mindless scavengers with the ability to add the bones of creatures they consume to their own forms. Despite this, mistwraiths are relatively harmless.

Koloss are violent creatures that kill with superhuman strength and are created using Hemalurgy. They grow to a maximum height of about 13 feet, at which point their hearts cannot support their bulk and they die. They only have two emotional states: boredom and rage.

Inquisitors are creatures of Ruin; their powers are gained through Hemalurgy. An Inquisitor is created when several Hemalurgic spikes are pounded through a Feruchemist or an Allomancer into the body of a human, usually an Allomancer or an existing Inquisitor. Most Inquisitors are mistings with the power of allomancy called a "seeker", meaning that they can burn a metal to see if there are other Allomancers nearby.

Post-Catacendre Scadrial 
The term "Twinborn" was not introduced until the fourth book. A Twinborn is a person with one Allomantic power and one Feruchemical power.  There is no relation between the Allomantic and Feruchemical metals of a Twinborn and most of them have different ones. A Twinborn having the same Allomantic and Feruchemical affinities significantly enhances both, even if the abilities themselves are unrelated. It also allows Compounding, where an allomancer burns a metalmind which provides significantly more feruchemical effect than the charge of the metalmind.

The Church of the Survivor worships Kelsier, who served as its first martyr. Vin, the Heir to The Survivor and Kelsier's 'disciple', was also worshiped. Kelsier created the Church as the means of spreading hope for freedom and equality among the Skaa, so they would finally rebel. There are a number of other religions in the series, most of which are studied for historical and philosophical purposes only.

Magic

In the world where "Mistborn" takes place, Scadrial, magic is depicted as a supernatural force harnessed by three distinct disciplines: Allomancy, Feruchemy, and Hemalurgy. All three magic systems are based on metals, which are used by the invested individual to grant them specific abilities. Their power originates in the Shards, Preservation and Ruin, the two god-like beings that are present in the Mistborn world. This power later fuses to become Harmony.

Allomancy 
In the Mistborn series, Allomancy is a predominantly genetic ability that allows a person to metabolize ("burn") metals, ingested by the Allomancer, for magical powers that can enhance physical and mental capacities. There are 16 metals that such Allomancers can use, with each metal granting a specific ability. In addition to these, there are two fictional metals, Atium and Lerasium that are the solid manifestation of the powers of Ruin and Preservation respectively. A person who is only able to burn one of the Allomantic metals is known as a Misting. Anyone who is naturally capable of burning all of the metals is called a Mistborn. In the first trilogy, only Mistings and Mistborn existed, although in the second series, interbreeding caused a new phenomenon of people with one Allomantic and one Feruchemical ability, called Twinborn.

Origins of Allomancy
In The Well of Ascension and The Hero of Ages, it is revealed that Allomancy originates from the power of Preservation. There are three sources (or origins) of Allomantic abilities in the Mistborn world:

 Lerasium beads: Burning the fictional metal, Lerasium, which is the solid form of Preservation's power, turns a person into a Mistborn. This was how the Lord Ruler "created" the Allomantic bloodlines among the Final Empire's noblemen.
 Snapping: The mists, the gaseous form of Preservation's power, that appear in the Mistborn world when power returns to the Well of Ascension would begin to violently activate ("snap") innate Allomantic abilities in people.
 Genetic descent: Descendants of Allomancers were also likely to have Allomantic abilities, though it takes physical anguish to awaken them.

Allomantic metals
The Allomantic metals come in four groupings of four metals: Physical, Mental, Temporal and Enhancement. Each of these four groupings have two base metals and their corresponding alloys, which in turn have a related ability that counteracts or balances the base metal. Each metal produces an internal or an external effect.

In addition to the basic Allomantic metals, there are two fictional "God metals": Atium and Lerasium and their alloys. Burning lerasium or its alloys can turn regular humans into Mistborn and Mistings respectively. Atium allows Allomancers to see into the future. In The Final Empire, an atium alloy called Malatium is revealed, which allows an Allomancer to look at what another person could have been had they made different choices. A misting who can only use atium are called seers. In The Hero of Ages, the atium-Misting Yomen appears to believe that atium and malatium are among the standard Allomantic metals - of which, at the start of the series, only ten are known to normal allomancers, including atium and gold but not malatium or electrum: the latter two are "discovered" during the series, along with aluminum and duralumin, all having been previously known to the Lord Ruler but kept secret. Thus, with these four discoveries, the original ten, and the revealed importance of the number sixteen, Yomen - and later Sazed, when he ascends and leaves behind his final written message - come to the conclusion that since there are now fourteen known Allomantic metals, therefore there must be two more that are unknown (which the Lord Ruler may have also known about, but did not reveal the knowledge, and certainly nobody else knows). Whereas in fact, with atium and malatium not counting among the sixteen, there are in fact not two but four unknown metals (chromium, nicrosil, cadmium and bendalloy) which do not appear until later books. "Lerasium" is also not given a name in the initial trilogy, nor counted as an allomantic metal, although its last known bead is used to turn the previously "normal" Elend Venture into an unusually powerful Mistborn.

Dangers & side-effects
Allomancers who flare their metal intensely for extended periods of time may be physiologically altered by the constant influx of Allomantic power. These Allomancers are known as Allomantic Savants. These people experience heightened ability with, and dependence upon, whatever metal they are burning in such a manner. Under most circumstances, this is considered damaging and it is believed that this process is irreversible, without powerful external intervention.

Feruchemy
Feruchemy is a genetic ability found among the people of the Terris region. A person who can use only one Feruchemical metal is known as a Ferring, while those who can use them all are called Feruchemists.

Feruchemy involves the use of the same metals as Allomancy, but rather than ingest the metals, they can be worn or carried by the Feruchemist.  Unlike Allomancy, the metal itself is not consumed but is used as storage of the Feruchemist's own attributes. Feruchemists refer to the metals that they use as metalminds. As long as a metal is in contact with the skin and the Feruchemist has stored something in it, it can be drawn upon. Usually only the Feruchemist that originally stored the attribute can use it.

Background of Feruchemy
During the events written by Sanderson in The Final Empire, the Lord Ruler hunted any and all Feruchemists he could find and it was commonly believed before The Fall that Feruchemists had been entirely exterminated. It was revealed in The Final Empire that they had not all been killed and that shortly after The Fall, they began to travel and teach the skaa the things that they needed to know to effectively live and develop on their own.

Feruchemical Metals
All Allomantic metals can be used for Feruchemy but the primary difference between Allomancy and Feruchemy is the way that the metals are used.  All an Allomancer needs to gain an ability is burn the appropriate metal but a Feruchemist must spend time without whatever attribute they wish to store. The Feruchemist can then tap into those stores at a later time, making themselves superhumanly powerful for a short duration.

Twinborn
In The Alloy of Law, it is revealed that the mixing of Allomantic and Feruchemical bloodlines led to the creation of Twinborn; people who had one Allomantic and Feruchemical ability.

Twinborn also have a mysterious extra "effect" that gives them powers slightly beyond what the sum of their standard feruchemical and allomantic powers might imply.

Hemalurgy
Hemalurgy is the third metallic art in the Mistborn series, and is based on the powers of the force Ruin, (balancer of the force of preservation; and depicted as evil). It allows the transfer of allomantic and feruchemical powers from one person to another, though with a net loss of power. It is the least known among the three arts.

To use Hemalurgy, a metal spike must be driven through a point in the body of the power donor. The spike is then removed and placed into a point in the body of another person for them to receive the power. The spike must be exposed to the donor's flowing blood to work (thus the prefix hema-, meaning blood).

The most important factor in determining what power is transferred is the type of metal used, with the specific points chosen on the donor and recipient also having an effect. The most common method is to stab the hemalurgic spike into the heart of the donor, continuing immediately through their body to the recipient's, as the longer the spike is left out of a body, the more power it loses.

Piercing critical organs of the receiver such as their heart or brain does not necessarily kill them. However, having a hemalurgic enhancement makes one susceptible to outside influence. Hemalurgic creations, like the koloss and kandra as well as the Steel Inquisitors can be controlled by a sufficiently powerful emotional allomancer.

In the Final Empire, the piercings on the Steel Inquisitors were used by the Lord Ruler to gain power over them and direct them as he chose to.

Other works 
Sanderson published a novella, Mistborn: Secret History on January 26, 2016; it is set during the first trilogy.

In other media

Role-playing game
In early 2009, Brandon Sanderson announced he was working with Crafty Games to release a role-playing game based on the series. While the release date was originally placed as "sometime in 2009", it shifted multiple times before being released in December 2011 in PDF, softcover, and hardcover editions.

Film
In 2010, Brandon Sanderson optioned the rights to the Mistborn books to Paloppa Pictures LLC. In Q1 of 2014 Paloppa Pictures' option ran out. In October 2016, the rights to the entire Cosmere universe, including the Mistborn series, were licensed by DMG Entertainment. On January 27, 2017, Deadline Hollywood reported that DMG signed F. Scott Frazier as the screenwriter for the adaptation of Mistborn: The Final Empire. On March 5, 2020, Brandon Sanderson stated that he was currently writing the screenplay of 'Mistborn: The Final Empire'.

Video games
In March 2012, a video game prequel called Mistborn: Birthright was announced slated for a fall 2013 release. The game had been delayed until 2015 to take advantage of the PlayStation 4 and Xbox One and then delayed again to Fall 2016.  Sanderson said in a November 2016 Q&A that Mistborn: Birthright is "dead". Developed by Little Orbit, Brandon Sanderson had written the story of the game. On July 24, 2017, an official cancellation of the game was posted by the CEO of Little Orbit, Matthew Scott, on Facebook.

On May 27, 2021, it was announced that Mistborn would cross over with Fortnite. Later that day, Kelsier was released in the item shop for purchase, bundled with other items from the Mistborn universe.

Board game
In 2016, a kickstarter campaign raised funds for a board game centered on the Mistborn series called Mistborn: House War. Developed by Crafty Games and designed by Kevin Wilson, House War is the first board game set in the Mistborn world and takes players on an adventure to play the role of leaders of the great noble Houses, struggling to weather the cataclysmic events of the first novel of the series. The game started shipping to backers in late August 2017. In 2018, a digital version of the boardgame was published on Tabletopia.

Crafty Games also released an expansion for Mistborn: House War called Mistborn: The Siege of Luthadel in which players take the role of factions attacking or defending Luthadel during the events of the second novel

Reception
Forbes magazine praises all of the books in the Mistborn series, saying that "The narrative is crafted with such bloody precision, it's nearly impossible to put the books down."

References

Further reading

External links
 
 
 Mistborn. Mormon Literature & Creative Arts Database.

Mistborn series
Tor Books books
Fantasy novel series